The University of North Texas Symphony Orchestra was established in 1920s at the University of North Texas College of Music—then known as North Texas State Teachers College School of Music. In 2008, the student musicians in the orchestra represented 25 states and 12 countries.
 
David Itkin became Music Director of the UNT Symphony Orchestra and Director of Orchestral Studies, effective fall 2008.

Performance samples 

Symphony Orchestra

New World Symphony, Scherzo (Molto vivace) (live), Antonín Dvořák (2005)
 Anshel Brusilow, conductor
Concerto for Marimba and String Orchestra - Mvt III, Eric Ewazen (1999)
Ming-Jen Suen, solost
Hyunseok Chang, conductor
Rehearsal, Concerto for Trumpet, Henri Tomasi (2002)
 Anshel Brusilow, conductor

Conductors

Major tours 
 1992 — The UNT Symphony Orchestra performed in Spain and throughout Mediterranean.
 1993 — By invitation, the Symphony Orchestra performed Verdi’s Requiem in Monterrey, Mexico.

References

External links 
 UNT Symphony Orchestra

University orchestras
University of North Texas
Texas classical music
Musical groups established in 1924
1924 establishments in Texas
Musical groups from Denton, Texas
Orchestras based in Texas
Music